Neopectinimura is a genus of moths in the family Lecithoceridae.

Species
Neopectinimura beckeri Park, 2010
Neopectinimura calligina Park and Byun, 2010
Neopectinimura devosi Park, 2014
Neopectinimura madangensis Park and Byun, 2010
Neopectinimura morobeensis Park and Byun, 2010 
Neopectinimura setiola Park and Byun, 2010
Neopectinimura trichodes Park, 2014
Neopectinimura walmakensis Park, 2014

References

 
Lecithocerinae
Moth genera